William Audley Bowdler (7 September 1884 – 20 February 1969)  was a Liberal Party politician in England who served briefly as a Member of Parliament (MP) in the early 1920s.

Background
He was born in Kirkham, Lancashire, the son of W. H. Bowdler and E. A. Richards, of Clifton, Lancashire. He was educated at Rossall School. In 1918 he married Marguerite Parkes, of Woldingham. They had one son and three daughters.

Political career
He started his parliamentary career in March 1922 when he was selected as the Liberal prospective parliamentary candidate for the Holderness division of East Yorkshire. As a Lancastrian, he was an outsider to the constituency not expected to defeat the sitting Unionist MP Arthur Wilson who had held the seat for 22 years. During the 1922 general election campaign held in November, The Times were happy to write off his prospects of victory; "The Conservatives hold on Holderness is not believed to be seriously endangered. The farmers may be cross, but many of them have voted Conservative all their lives, and will not easily break with their political traditions." His victory, on a swing of 16% was therefore a surprise;

Another General Election came around a year later and despite the Liberal Party experiencing something of a revival, Bowdler lost his seat in the House of Commons at the 1923 general election, to a new Conservative candidate Samuel Savery, 

He did not stand again.

References

1884 births
1969 deaths
Liberal Party (UK) MPs for English constituencies
UK MPs 1922–1923